Pleurotus pulmonarius, commonly known as the Indian oyster, Italian oyster, phoenix mushroom, or the lung oyster, is a mushroom very similar to Pleurotus ostreatus, the pearl oyster, but with a few noticeable differences. The caps of pulmonarius are much paler and smaller than ostreatus and develops more of a stem. P. pulmonarius also prefers warmer weather than ostreatus and will appear later in the summer. Otherwise, the taste and cultivation of the two species is generally described as largely the same. Another similar species, North America's Pleurotus populinus, is restricted to growing on aspen and cottonwood.

Natural habitat
Pleurotus pulmonarius is widespread in temperate and subtropical forests throughout the world. In the eastern United States, this species is generally found on hardwoods while in the west it is commonly found on conifers.

Taxonomy
1821 First published as Agaricus pulmonarius by Fr.
1975 Disambiguated from Pleurotus sajor-caju by Pegler

Description
Pileus: 5 — 20+ cm, convex, becoming broadly convex to flat; fruit bodies may yellow with age
Gills: Whitish; decurrent if stipe is present; small beetles may be present
Spore print: White to yellowish
Stipe: If present, short and offset from the center of the cap, with a hairy base
Microscopic features: Spores white to yellowish to lavender-gray when dense, more or less cylindrical, 7.5–11 × 3–4 μm.
Odour: Pleasant, like anise

Cultivation
Pleurotus pulmonarius is the most cultivated oyster mushroom (Pleurotus) species in Europe and North America. The most popular varieties for cultivation are the warm weather varieties, often marketed by spawn manufacturers  and cultivators under the incorrect name "Pleurotus sajor-caju". The real Pleurotus sajor-caju (Fr.) Singer is in fact a separate species of mushroom, which was returned to the genus Lentinus by Pegler (1975), and is now called Lentinus sajor-caju (Fr.) Fries.

Pleurotus pulmonarius is commercially cultivated in New Zealand, and is sometimes sold as "Oyster mushrooms". The archetypal oyster mushroom, Pleurotus ostreatus, cannot be imported into New Zealand due to perceived risks to their forestry industry.

The cultivation of Pleurotus pulmonarius is very similar to how one would cultivate other types of Pleurotus species like P. ostreatus by transferring mycelium from a petri plate onto grain and then transferring the  grain spawn after the mycelium colonizes it to substrates of straw, wood chips, sawdust, cardboard, coffee grounds, and other cellulose-based substrates.

Medical research

Several studies done on animals and in vitro suggest P. pulmonarius and its extracts may have possible medicinal applications for a wide range of conditions.

A polysaccharide called β-D-Glucan from P. pulmonarius reduces sensitivity to pain in mice, and could be an "attractive" basis for new analgesic medications. In a different study on mice, a glucan from P. pulmonarius showed potent anti-inflammatory and analgesic properties. A methanol extract of P. pulmonarius displayed anti-inflammatory and antitumor activity comparable to the standard reference drugs diclofenac and cisplatin, respectively.

A 2010 study concluded that extracts of P. pulmonarius may slow the proliferation of cancer cells with high galectin-3 levels, while at the same time downregulate tumour cell adherencewhich is directly related to the progression and spread of cancer. Extracts of P. pulmonarius added to the diet of mice delayed carcinogenesis, suggesting that these extracts may be useful as an adjuvant to cancer therapies.

An orally administered hot water extract of P. pulmonarius had a significant antihyperglycemic effect, halted the progression of diabetes, and reduced the mortality of alloxan induced diabetic mice by approximately 50%. It showed a synergistic effect with the antidiabetic drug glibenclamide, supporting the possibility of effective combination therapy of glibenclamide and P. pulmonarius for diabetes.

Pleurotus pulmonarius may be effective in the treatment of hay fever by inhibiting the release of histamine. Powdered P. pulmonarius mushrooms caused a significant reduction in sneezing and nasal rubbing when fed in water to sensitized mice, although the effect gradually builds up over a matter of weeks. When they were given 500 mg/kg a day, a significant effect was observed after two weeks, and it was four weeks before a significant change was observed at 200 mg/kg.

Extracts of P. pulmonarius attenuated the development of acute colitis in a mouse model, suggesting a possible clinical use in the treatment of colitis. A further study by the same authors concluded that the extracts also inhibit colon cancer formation associated with colitis in mice.

Extracts of P. pulmonarius have antimicrobial properties and exhibit antioxidant activity in vitro.

Similar species
Pleurotus ostreatus is very similar, as is North America's Pleurotus populinus, which is restricted to growing on aspen and cottonwood (genus Populus). It may resemble a clitocybe, some of which are poisonous, when growing on the top of wood.

See also
List of Pleurotus species

References

External links

Pleurotaceae
Carnivorous fungi
Edible fungi
Fungi described in 1821
Taxa named by Elias Magnus Fries